Sir Anthony Irby (c. 1605 – 2 January 1682) was an English politician who sat in the House of Commons  at various times between 1628 and 1682.

Irby was the eldest son of Sir Anthony Irby and his wife Elizabeth Peyton, third daughter of Sir John Peyton, 1st Baronet and was born before 17 January 1605. He was admitted a fellow-commoner at Emmanuel College, Cambridge in 1620. He was knighted on  2 June 1624. In 1628, Irby was elected Member of Parliament for Boston and sat until 1629 when King Charles decided to rule without parliament for eleven years. He was High Sheriff of Lincolnshire in 1637.

In April 1640, Irby was elected MP for Boston again in the Short Parliament. He was re-elected MP for Boston for the Long Parliament in November 1640.  He sat until 1648 when he was excluded under Pride's Purge.

Irby was re-elected MP for Boston in 1656 for the Second Protectorate Parliament and elected for the seat again in 1659 for the Third Protectorate Parliament. In April 1660 he was re-elected MP for Boston for the Convention Parliament and was elected again in 1661 for the Cavalier Parliament. He was elected again in the second election of 1679 for the Second Exclusion Parliament and in 1681.

Irby married firstly, in 1623, Frances Wray, daughter of Sir William Wray, 1st Baronet, and had by her an only daughter, Elizabeth, who married Hon. George Montagu. He married secondly Margaret Smyth, daughter of Sir Richard Smythe, 2nd Baronet and after her death in 1631, next Margaret Barkham, daughter of Sir Edward Barkham, 1st Baronet, who died in 1640. By his second and third wife, Irby had no surviving children, three daughters having died as infants. On 19 August 1641, he married finally Catharine Paget, third daughter of William Paget, 4th Baron Paget, and had by her a son and five daughters.

References

1605 births
1682 deaths
Alumni of Emmanuel College, Cambridge
High Sheriffs of Lincolnshire
English MPs 1640 (April)
English MPs 1640–1648
English MPs 1656–1658
English MPs 1659
English MPs 1660
English MPs 1661–1679
English MPs 1680–1681
English MPs 1681